Master of Medicine (MMed) is a postgraduate professional clinical degree awarded by medical schools to physicians following a period of instruction, supervised clinical rotations, and examination. The degree usually takes three years to complete, but may take up to four years in some countries. It is awarded by both surgical and medical subspecialties and usually includes a dissertation component. The degree may complement an existing fellowship in the chosen specialty or be the sole qualification necessary for registration as a specialist.

The advantages of an MMed over membership certificated qualifications are that, whilst both groups are clinically competent at their levels, an MMed specialist can enroll into a four-year PhD plus fellowship and complete as consultants with a PhD, or do a two-year fellowship without a PhD. However, members of various professional colleges only advance to fellowship graduating as non-PhD consultants which reduces their academic ranking, as most universities insist on a PhD for their teaching staff. Another advantage of an MMed is that it takes less years to sub-specialise compared to professional membership which often hold practitioners as 'general specialists' even at fellowship level. It is envisaged that, most professional colleges will soon adopt the MMed and Fellowship/PhD certification system.

As of May 2009, the following universities in the following countries award MMed degrees leading to specialists practice in the following subjects:

Australia

University of Queensland
 MMed in General Practice
 MMed in Primary Care Skin Cancer Medicine

University of Sydney
 MMed in Ophthalmology
 MMed in Sleep Medicine
 MMed in Critical Care Medicine

Monash University
 MMed in Perioperative Medicine

P.R. China

Chinese Universities in collaboration with their affiliated hospitals award  two categories of master's degrees of Medicine: Specialty MMed or Academic MMed degrees. Specialty MMed degrees are awarded after a supervised rotational training in the university's Affiliated Teaching hospitals and lead to registration as specialist.   Academic MMed degrees on the other hand  are Research and Basic Sciences oriented,    focusing more on medical laboratory research  . Both qualifications are acceptable prerequisites for PhD enrolment. The entry requirements of both Specialty and Academic MMed programs are MBBS or related undergraduate medical qualifications.

Graduates of Specialty MMed qualifications can either choose to practise as specialist physicians and surgeons in their respective specialties or undergo subspecialty PhD/Fellowship training  leading to an advanced  specialisation practice as consultants. The most important condition for gaining admission into MMed program is the availability of supervising professors or consultants who are willing to mentor the student.

Guyana

Texila American University
The following MMed courses are available at Texila American University:

 MMed in Pediatrics
 MMed in Psychiatry
 MMed in Pathology
 MMed in Surgery
 MMed in Anesthesia
 MMed in Ear Nose and Throat Surgery
 MMed in Diagnostic Radiology
 MMed in Obstetrics and Gynecology
 MMed in Immunology
 MMed in Internal Medicine 
 MMed in Neurology
 MMed in Dermatology
 MMed in Emergency Medicine 
 MMed in Ophthalmology 
 MMed in Orthopaedics 
 MMed in Forensic Medicine
 MMed in Human Anatomy & Histo-Embryology

Kenya

University of Nairobi
Various MMed courses are available at University of Nairobi and Moi University.

Malaysia

Universiti of Malaya 
 MMed in Clinical Pathology
 MMed in Medical Physics
 MMed in Internal Medicine
 MMed in Emergency Medicine
 MMed in Clinical Oncology
 MMed in Anaesthesiology
 MMed in Medical Science
 MMed in Nursing Science
 MMed in Obstetrics & Gynaecology
 MMed in Paediatrics
 MMed in Paediatrics Surgery
 MMed in Otorhinolaryngology

Universiti Sains Malaysia

Medical Based Programs 
 MMed in Anaesthesiology
 MMed in Emergency Medicine
 MMed in Family Medicine
 MMed in Internal Medicine
 MMed in Paediatrics
 MMed in Psychiatry
 MMed in Radiology

Surgical Based Programs 
 MMed in Obstetrics & Gynaecology
 MMed in Ophthalmology
 MMed in Orthopaedics
 MMed in Otorhinolaryngology
 MMed in Surgery
 MMed in Neurosurgery
 MMed in Plastic Surgery

Singapore
The Master of Medicine (MMed) is conferred by the National University of Singapore (NUS) Division of Graduate Medical Studies.
MMed in Internal Medicine
MMed in Surgery (may be taken jointly with the MRCS examinations)
MMed in Pediatrics
MMed in Obstetrics & Gynaecology
MMed in Occupational Medicine
MMed in Public Health
MMed in Psychiatry
MMed in Family Medicine
MMed in Diagnostic Radiology
MMed in Orthopaedic Surgery
MMed in Otorhinolaryngology
MMed in Emergency Medicine

South Africa

University of Cape Town
The following MMed courses are available at the University of Cape Town
 MMed in Occupational Medicine
 MMed in Public Health
 MMed in Anesthesia
 MMed in Anatomical Pathology
 MMed in Haematology
 MMed in Internal Medicine
 MMed in Microbiology and Immunology
 MMed in Obstetrics and Gynecology
 MMed in Ophthalmology
 MMed in Orthopedics
 MMed in Otorhinolaryngology
 MMed in Pediatrics
 MMed in Psychiatry
 MMed in Radiology
MMed in Radiation Oncology
 MMed in Surgery

University of Pretoria
The following MMed courses are available at the University of Pretoria
 MMed in Anaesthesiology  
 MMed in Dermatology  
 MMed in Emergency Medicine  
 MMed in Family Medicine  
 MMed in Geriatrics  
 MMed in Internal Medicine  
 MMed in Medical Oncology  
 MMed in Neurology  
 MMed in Neurosurgery  
 MMed in Nuclear Medicine  
 MMed in Obstetrics and Gynaecology  
 MMed in Ophthalmology  
 MMed in Orthopaedics  
 MMed in Otorhinolaryngology  
 MMed in Paediatrics  
 MMed in Anatomical Pathology  
 MMed in Chemical Pathology 
 MMed in Clinical Pathology  
 MMed in Forensic Pathology  
 MMed in Haematology  
 MMed in Medical Microbiology 
 MMed in Medical Virology 
 MMed in Plastic Surgery  
 MMed in Psychiatry  
 MMed in Public Health  
 MMed in Radiation Oncology 
 MMed in Diagnostic Radiology  
 MMed in Surgery 
 MMed in Paediatric Surgery 
 MMed in Thoracic Surgery  
 MMed in Urology  
 MMilMed - Master of Military Medicine

Tanzania

Muhimbili University
The following MMed courses are available at Muhimbili University:

 MMed in Anesthesiology
 MMed in Anatomical Pathology
 MMed in Clinical Oncology
 MMed in Emergency Medicine
 MMed in Haematology
 MMed in Internal Medicine
 MMed in Microbiology and Immunology
 MMed in Obstetrics and Gynecology
 MMed in Ophthalmology
 MMed in Orthopedics and Trauma
 MMed in Otorhinolaryngology
 MMed in Pediatrics
 MMed in Psychiatry
 MMed in Radiology
 MMed in Surgery
 MMed in Urology

University of Dodoma
The following MMed courses are available at University of Dodoma:

 MMed in Internal Medicine
 MMed in Microbiology and Immunology
 MMed in Obstetrics and Gynecology
 MMed in Pediatrics
 MMed in Psychiatry
 MMed in Surgery

Kilimanjaro Christian Medical University College
The following MMed courses are available at Kilimanjaro Christian Medical University College:

 MMed in Anesthesiology
 MMed in Dermato-Venereology
 MMed in Internal Medicine
 MMed in Obstetrics and Gynecology
 MMed in Ophthalmology
 MMed in Orthopedics and Trauma
 MMed in Otorhinolaryngology
 MMed in Pediatrics
 MMed in Diagnostic Radiology
 MMed in Surgery
 MMed in Urology

Catholic University of Health and Allied Sciences
The following MMed courses are available at Catholic University of Health and Allied Sciences:

 MMed in Anatomical Pathology
 MMed in Internal Medicine
 MMed in Obstetrics and Gynecology
 MMed in Orthopedics and Trauma
 MMed in Pediatrics
 MMed in Surgery

Uganda

Gulu University
The following MMed courses are available at Gulu University School of Medicine:

 MMed in Surgery
 MMed in Psychiatry

Makerere University
The following MMed courses are available at Makerere University School of Medicine:

 MMed in Anesthesiology and Critical Care
 MMed in Family Medicine
 MMed in Internal Medicine
 MMed in Medical Oncology
 MMed in Neurosurgery
 MMed in Obstetrics and Gynecology
 MMed in Ophthalmology
 MMed in Otolaryngology
 MMed in Pediatrics
 MMed in Psychiatry
 MMed in Surgery
 MMed in Surgical Oncology
 MMed in Urology

Mbarara University
The following MMed courses are available at Mbarara University School of Medicine:

 MMed in Internal Medicine
 MMed in Obstetrics and Gynecology
 MMed in Pediatrics
 MMed in Surgery
 MMed in Plastic & Reconstructive Surgery

Uganda Martyrs University
The following MMed courses are available at Uganda Martyrs University School of Medicine:

 MMed in Internal Medicine
 MMed in Obstetrics and Gynecology
 MMed in Pediatrics
 MMed in Surgery
 MMed in Emergency Medicine

Kampala International University 
The following MMed courses are available at Kampala International University

MMed in Internal Medicine
MMed in Obstetrics and Gynecology
MMed in Pediatrics
MMed in Surgery
MMed in Psychiatry

Zambia

University of Zambia
The following MMed courses are available at University of Zambia:

 MMed in Pediatrics
 MMed in Clinical Pathology
 MMed in Psychiatry
 MMed in Internal Medicine
 MMed in Infectious Diseases
 MMed in General Surgery
 MMed in Urology
 MMed in Orthopaedics and Trauma
 MMed in Obstetrics and Gynecology
 MMed in Family Medicine
 MMed in Ophthalmology
 MMed in Otorhinolaryngology
 MMed in Anaesthesiology
 MMed in Neurology

Zimbabwe

University of Zimbabwe
The following MMed courses are available at University of Zimbabwe:

 MMed in Medicine
 MMed in Anaesthetics
 MMed in Obstetrics & Gynaecology
 MMed in Paediatrics
 MMed in Surgery
 MMed in Neurosurgery
 MMed in Urology
 MMed in Otorhinolaryngology
 MMed in Medicine
 MMed in Psychiatry
 MMed in Ophthalmology
 MMed in Histopathology
 MMed in Radiotherapy and Oncology

Democratic Republic of the Congo

University of Lubumbashi
The following MMed courses are available at University of Zimbabwe:
 MMed in Medicine
 MMed in Anaesthetics
 MMed in Obstetrics & Gynaecology
 MMed in Paediatrics
 MMed in Surgery
 MMed in Medicine
 MMed in Psychiatry
 MMed in Ophthalmology
 MMed in Histopathology

University of Kinshasa
 MMed in Medicine
 MMed in Anaesthetics
 MMed in Obstetrics & Gynaecology
 MMed in Paediatrics
 MMed in Surgery
 MMed in Neurosurgery
 MMed in Urology
 MMed in Otorhinolaryngology
 MMed in Medicine
 MMed in Psychiatry
 MMed in Ophthalmology
 MMed in Histopathology

See also
 Medical education

References
18. Ji T. The standardized residency training program and on-the-job application clinical medical professional degrees. Contin Med Educ. 2009;23:6–8. (in Chinese) [Google Scholar]

19. The Central People's Government of the People's Republic of China. Law of the People's Republic of China on medical practitioners. 1999 PRC President Decree No 5.

20. Wu LJ, Peng XX, Wang W. The different roles of medical degrees in the career of doctors between UK and China. Academic Degrees and Graduate education. 2007;(10):42–6.[Google Scholar]

External links
 Post Graduate Medical Education Resources

Medical degrees
Medicine
Medicine